Coolmeen GAA is a Gaelic Athletic Association club based in Coolmeen, County Clare, Ireland. It takes part in competitions organised by the Clare GAA county board. It fields teams in Gaelic football.

History
Coolmeen GAA club was formed in 1887. Since then the club has won numerous Gaelic Football championship titles at adult and underage level. Throughout the last century Coolmeen has won two senior football championships, as well as having success at intermediate and junior levels. The club's adult football team are currently at intermediate status. The last Junior 'A' championship came to Coolmeen in 1999 with a one-point victory over Clondegad in the final. The most recent success came to the club in 2010 when the U21s beat O'Currys/Naoimh Eoin to win their second Under-21 "C" championship in a row. In 2015 the club won the county junior championship after 16 years and then went on to contest the Munster junior football championship final where they lost to Templenoe of Kerry.

Major honours

Gaelic Football
 Clare Senior Football Championship (2): 1919, 1922
 Clare Football League Div. 1 (Cusack Cup) (1): 1944
 Clare Intermediate Football Championship (3): 1959, 1966, 1967
 Munster Junior Club Football Championship Runners-Up: 2015
 Clare Junior A Football Championship (6): 1922, 1958, 1964, 1983, 1999, 2015
 Clare Under-21 A Football Championship (1): 2021 (as Cill Cúil Gaels with Kildysart, Kilmihil & Shannon Gaels)
 Clare Under 21 C Football Championship (4): 2009, 2010, 2015, 2016.

Hurling
 West Clare Hurling Championship (1): 1999

Notable players
Cathal O'Connor and Noel Meaney have represented the county at senior level in the last ten years. Stevie Murphy also with a record-breaking 4 u21 c county championship medals.
Thomas Kenny also deserves an honourable mention for his contribution to the club.

References

External links 
 Official website

Gaelic football clubs in County Clare
Gaelic games clubs in County Clare